was a Japanese professional sumo wrestler from Tokunoshima in the Amami Islands. He was the sport's 46th yokozuna. He was also a sumo coach and head of Takasago stable.

Career
He was born  on Tokunoshima in the Amami Islands. Due to the Amami Islands being occupied by America, in 1948 he stowed away on a cargo ship and was supported by a relative in Hyogo Prefecture. Making his professional debut in October 1948, he at first fought under his real name. He was billed in sumo as being from Kobe in Hyogo until America returned the Anami Islands to Japan in 1953, and was thereafter billed as being from Kagoshima Prefecture.

In September 1950 he reached the second highest jūryō division and won the championship with a 14–1 record. This earned him immediate promotion to the top makuuchi division in January 1951. He adopted the shikona or ring name of Asashio Tarō in 1952. In his early career he earned seven kinboshi or gold stars for defeating yokozuna, three of them coming in one tournament in January 1955 when he beat Yoshibayama on Day 5 and then Chiyonoyama and Tochinishiki on Days 8 and 9.

Asashio won five top division tournament championships, all but one of them in Osaka. He won this tournament three years in a row from 1956 to 1958. His first title was won at sekiwake rank in a three way playoff that also involved future yokozuna Wakanohana Kanji I and maegashira Wakahaguro. He earned promotion to ōzeki a year later after winning his second championship. In November 1958 he won the tournament in Kyūshū with a 14–1 record. After runner-up honours in the next two tournaments he was finally promoted to yokozuna at nearly 30 years of age. His time at sumo's highest rank was difficult as he missed many bouts through injury. He had to sit out the three tournaments following his yokozuna debut and was only able to win one further tournament, in March 1961. He did not take part in the January 1962 tournament and announced his retirement at the age of 32.

Asashio was known for his thick chest hair and eyebrows. In 1959, he appeared on the cover of the first issue of Weekly Shōnen Magazine and in Hiroshi Inagaki's film The Three Treasures.

Retirement from sumo
Asashio remained in the sumo world as an elder under the name of Furiwake, and became head coach of Takasago stable in 1971 after the death of the previous stablemaster, former yokozuna Maedayama. As Takasago-oyakata he coached Asashio Tarō IV and Konishiki to the rank of ōzeki. He predicted that Konishiki would reach the rank of yokozuna before his 25th birthday, but it did not happen. He also recruited the Samoan wrestler Nankairyū but after a heated argument with Takasago, Nankairyū ran away from the stable in September 1988. Takasago died of a stroke a few weeks later.

Pre-modern top division record
The New Year tournament began and the Spring tournament returned to Osaka in 1953.

Modern top division record
Since the addition of the Kyushu tournament in 1957 and the Nagoya tournament in 1958, the yearly schedule has remained unchanged.

See also
Glossary of sumo terms
List of past sumo wrestlers
List of sumo tournament top division champions
List of sumo tournament top division runners-up
List of sumo tournament second division champions
List of yokozuna

References

External links

 Japan Sumo Association profile

1929 births
1988 deaths
Japanese sumo wrestlers
People from the Amami Islands
Sportspeople from Kobe
Sumo people from Kagoshima Prefecture
Yokozuna